The Companies Act 1948 (11 & 12 Geo.6 c.38) was an Act of the Parliament of the United Kingdom, which regulated UK company law. Its descendant is the Companies Act 2006.

Cases decided under this Act
Bushell v Faith [1970] AC 1099
Scottish Co-operative Wholesale Society Ltd v Meyer
Stonegate Securities Ltd v Gregory [1980] Ch 576

See also
Companies Act

Notes

United Kingdom company law
United Kingdom Acts of Parliament 1948
1940s economic history